Tatyana Vladimirovna Kosterina (born 17 July 1977) is a Russian dressage rider. She competed at the 2018 World Equestrian Games, multiple European Dressage Championships, and competed as part of the Russian dressage team at the delay Tokyo 2020 Olympic Games.

Kosterina made her championships debut at the 2017 European Championships in Gothenburg, Sweden, where she placed 18th individually aboard Diavolessa and was the highest ranked Russian athlete. She went on to compete with Diavolessa at the 2018 World Equestrian Games and the 2019 European Championships, where she finished 35th and 33rd individually, respectively. Her highest team placing was achieved at the 2019 European, when the Russian team finished 9th.

Kosterina has been living and training in Germany since 2007, and is currently based at the equestrian centre in Bielefeld.

References

External links
 

1977 births
Living people
Russian female equestrians
Russian dressage riders
Equestrians at the 2020 Summer Olympics
Olympic equestrians of Russia
Sportspeople from Nizhny Novgorod